The men's +90 kg weightlifting competitions at the 1960 Summer Olympics in Rome took place on 10 September at the Palazzetto dello Sport. It was the ninth appearance of the heavyweight class.

Results

References

Weightlifting at the 1960 Summer Olympics